Mihai Țârlea (19 April 1938 – 28 February 1984) was a Romanian football forward. He spent his entire career at UTA Arad, managing to reach one Cupa României final, which was lost with 4–0 to Steaua București. His son, who is also named Mihai Țârlea was also a footballer who played at UTA.

International career
Mihai Țârlea played one game and scored two goals for Romania's Olympic team in a friendly which ended with a 4–1 victory against Czechoslovakia.

Honours
UTA Arad
Cupa României runner-up: 1965–66

Notes

References

External links

Mihai Țârlea at Labtof.ro

1938 births
1984 deaths
Romanian footballers
Olympic footballers of Romania
Association football forwards
Liga I players
FC UTA Arad players
People from Bihor County